Holy Family with Saints Anne and John the Baptist may refer to:

 Holy Family with Saints Anne and John the Baptist (Luini)
 Holy Family with Saints Anne and John the Baptist (Mantegna)